CTB may refer to:
 Catch the Beat, an alternative game mode in Dean "peppy" Herbert's osu! Rhythm Game
 CTB/McGraw-Hill, a division of the McGraw-Hill Companies
 California Testing Bureau, a division of the McGraw-Hill Companies
 Cement-treated Base, a specific type of soil cement, used as a base
 Ceylon Transport Board, the nationalised passenger transport venture in Sri Lanka
 Christchurch Transport Board, a defunct municipal public transport operator in Christchurch, New Zealand
 Coding tree block, a processing unit of the High Efficiency Video Coding (HEVC) video standard 
Commonwealth of The Bahamas
 Comprehensive Test Ban - goal of the Comprehensive Test Ban Treaty
 Cooper Tire & Rubber Company's NYSE ticker symbol
 Ryan Giggs or CTB, the claimant in CTB v News Group Newspapers and CTB v. Twitter Inc., Persons Unknown
 Crabtree Technology Building, a Brigham Young University building
 Crash Thunder Buster, a finishing move of Jyushin Thunder Liger
 Cholera toxin B, a subunit of cholera toxin used for retrograde tracing
 Cut Bank Municipal Airport IATA code
 Citybus, a public bus operator in Hong Kong
 Catch the bus, internet slang for committing suicide
 Canadian Tire Bank, the retail deposit-taking and credit card-issuing arm of Canadian Tire Corporation, Limited
 .ctb, Color-dependent Plot Style Table, a file extension used by AutoCAD
 Coffee Table Book
 Consorcio de Transportes de Bizkaia, Biscay Transport Consortium